Aquatics at the 1991 Southeast Asian Games included swimming, diving and water polo events. The three sports of aquatics were held in Manila, Philippines. Aquatics events was held between 25 November to 29 November.

Medal winners

Swimming
Men's events

Women's events

Diving

Water polo

1991
1991 in water sports
1991 Southeast Asian Games events